The Defector is a 2009 spy novel by Daniel Silva. It spent four weeks as a New York Times Bestseller, reaching the list's top spot. It's the 9th book in the Gabriel Allon series.  Released July 21, 2009, the cover depicts the Houses of Parliament and Big Ben in London The cover of the paperback printing by Signet (July 2010) depicts St. Basil's Cathedral in Moscow.

Plot summary

Much of the story is set in Russia, where Gabriel Allon tries to rescue Russian defector Grigori Bulganov, who was introduced in an earlier book in the series. Bulganov had been kidnapped, and Gabriel Allon must save him from the clutches of Ivan Kharkov, also from the previous book.

International titles
Portuguese: O Desertor. (The Defector). (2010). 
Hebrew: העריק. (The Defector). (2011).

References

American spy novels
2009 American novels
Novels by Daniel Silva
Novels set in Russia
G. P. Putnam's Sons books